Time and Chance is a book by Kim Campbell, former Prime Minister of Canada. The book details the career of Kim Campbell from her first election to the Vancouver School Board to becoming the Prime Minister of Canada, as well as some details about her childhood and family.

1996 non-fiction books
Political autobiographies
Canadian autobiographies
Doubleday Canada books